I-35W & 98th Street is a bus rapid transit station on the Metro Orange Line at 98th Street adjacent to Interstate 35W in Bloomington, Minnesota. The station is integrated with the South Bloomington Transit Center, a transfer hub and park and ride facility opened in 2004. The transit center was as far south as Route 535, predecessor to the Orange Line, traveled, with no direct connection to the other side of the Minnesota River. The station opened December 4, 2021 with the rest of the Orange Line.

The parcels surrounding the station are being planned for a mix of transit oriented development.

Bus connections
18, 465, 534, 539, 546, 547

References

Bus stations in Minnesota